Loredana Bertè (born 20 September 1950) is an Italian singer and actress. In her long career she has worked with prominent Italian songwriters such as Pino Daniele, Ivano Fossati, Mario Lavezzi, Mango and Enrico Ruggeri, among others; her sister Mia Martini was also an acclaimed singer.  She has experimented with different genres, from rock to reggae, from funk to pop. Bertè is known for the eccentric clothing she wears onstage for her performances.

At one point in her life (1988–1992), she was married to the tennis star Björn Borg.

Career

Bertè was born in Bagnara Calabra, Province of Reggio Calabria, in Southern Italy on September 20 as the third of four daughters, three years after her sister Domenica. Her parents, Giuseppe Radames Bertè and Maria Salvina Dato, were both school teachers. Loredana spent her childhood in Porto Recanati and then in Ancona. After her parents separated, Bertè moved with her mother to Rome where she attended the local Art Institute.

In the early 1970s she performed as a go-go dancer in television and radio shows such as "Bandiera Gialla" and "Stasera Rita!". She later joined the dance troupe of the Piper Club in Rome, where she met Renato Zero. In 1969 both Bertè, Zero and Teo Teocoli starred in the Italian edition of the musical "Hair". In 1970 Loredana and her sister Domenica, who had by then changed her name to Mia Martini, performed as backing vocalists for Chico Buarque de Holanda. While Martini would consequently start a successful music career, recording songs like "Piccolo Uomo" and "Minuetto", Loredana continued to pursue theatre. In 1972 she performed in "Ciao Rudy" and "Orfeo 9". In 1974, producers Alfredo Cerruti and Enrico Riccardi persuaded Loredana to record her first album, Streaking. Bertè's second album, "Normale o Super" included "Sei Bellissima", Bertè's first domestic hit. In 1978, Bertè started a relationship with Ivano Fossati. Fossati produced the single "E la luna bussò", which is considered one of the early minstream reggae songs in Italy.

In the early 1980s Bertè spent a year in New York to work on her next album. Elio Fiorucci introduced her to Andy Warhol at the Factory. Warhol and Bertè collaborated on the music video for her song "Movie". In 1982 she won Festivalbar with "Non sono una signora". In 1985 she recorded the album Carioca in collaboration with Djavan. In 1986 she participated to the Sanremo Music Festival with the song "Re". In 1988 she met and married Björn Borg. The marriage would end in 1992. In 1993 Bertè and Mia Martini, collaborated on the song "Stiamo come stiamo". On May 12, 1995, Martini was found unresponsive in her apartment in Cardano al Campo (varese). Martini's death proved to be a devastating moment in Bertè's life.

In the early 2000s Loredana returned to theatre, performing with Carla Fracci in "Gerusalemme" at the Baths of Caracalla in Rome. She entrusts the direction of the three video clips that are part of the mini-CD "Dimmi che mi ami" of 2002. Two years later she took part in "Music Farm", the first reality show on Italian TV involving famous singers. Thanks to the show's proceeds, she produced the new album "Babybertè" (2005) by herself.

In April 2010 she suffered a bad fall, and the related surgery forced her to a lengthy hospitalization. She returned to the Sanremo Music Festival the following year, finishing fourth with the Gigi D'Alessio song "Respirare". Her following tour, "Bandabertè", ended up in Russia, where she participated in the international White Nights Festival in St. Petersburg.

In 2015 she played the judge's role in the talent "Friends of Maria De Filippi". In 2017 she recorded the songs "Allegria" with J-Ax and Fedez and "Occhi di Gatto" with Cristina D'Avena.

In 2016 Bertè staged a big show at the Verona Arena called "Amiche in Arena", performing a series of duets with other Italian female artists, including Fiorella Mannoia, Gianna Nannini, Patty Pravo and Irene Grandi.

Bertè's song "J'adore Venise" was included in Luca Guadagnino's Oscar-winning film's soundtrack, Call Me By Your Name (2017).

In 2018 she topped the Italian charts again with "Non ti dico no", a song made in collaboration with the reggae dancehall band Boomdabash. She also duetted with Fabio Rovazzi and J-Ax in "Senza pensieri".

Discography

Albums 
 Streaking (1974)
 Normale o super (1976) Italy: Gold
 TIR (1977) Italy: Gold
 BandaBertè (1979) Italy: Platinm
 Loredana Bertè (1980) Italy: Platinum
 Made in Italy (1981) Italy: Platinum
 Traslocando (1982) Italy: 5× Platinum
 Jazz (1983) Italy: Platinum
 Lorinedita (1983)
 Savoir faire (1984) Italy: Platinum
 Carioca (1985) Italy: Platinum
 Fotografando (1986) Italy: Platinum
 Io (1988) Italy: Gold
 Best (1991)
 Ufficialmente dispersi (1993)
 Bertex, ingresso libero (1994)
 Ufficialmente ritrovati (1995)
 Un pettirosso da combattimento (1997) Italy: Gold
 Decisamente Loredana (1998)
 BabyBertè (2005) Italy: Platinum
 BabyBertè – special edition Buch+cd+dvd (2006)
 BabyBertè live 2007 (2007)
 Bertilation (2008)
 Lola & Angiolina project (2009)
 LiBerté (2018) Italy: Gold

Singles 
 "Volevi un amore grande" (1974)
 "Sei bellissima" (1975) Italy: Diamond
 "Meglio libera" (1976)  Italy: Platinum
 "Fiabe" (1977) Italy: Platinum
 "Grida" (1997) Italy: Platinum
 "Decisamente Loredana" (1977)
 "Dedicato" (1978) Italy: Diamond
 "E la luna bussò" (1979) Italy: Diamond
 "In alto mare" (1980) Italy: Diamond
 "Movie" (1981) Italy: Platinum
 "Non sono una signora" (1982) Italy: Diamond
 "Per i tuoi occhi" (1982) Italy: Platinum
 "Acqua" (1985) Italy: Platinum
 "Re" (1986) Italy: Platinum
 "Io" (1988) Italy: Gold
 "In questa città" (1991)
 "Stiamo come stiamo" (1993)
 "Amici non ne ho" (1994)
 "Portami con te" (1998)
 "Dimmi che mi ami" (2002) Italy: Gold
 "Sarà perché ti amo (chi se ne frega!!)" (2004)
 "Strade di fuoco" (2006) Italy: Gold
 "Musica e parole" (2008) Italy: Gold
 "Cattiva" (Loredana Errore feat. Loredana Bertè) (2011)
 "Respirare" (with Gigi D'Alessio) (2012) Italy: Gold
 "Ma quale musica leggera" (2012)
 "Non ti dico no" (with Boomdabash) (2018) Italy: 2× Platinum
 "Cosa ti aspetti da me" (2019) Italy: Platinum
 Tequila e San Miguel (2019)
 Senza Pensieri (2019) Italy: Platinum
 Figlia di... (2021) Italy: Gold
 Tuttapposto (2021)
 Che sogno incredibile (2021) Italy: Gold

Filmography

Films

Television

Stage

References

External links 

 
 

1950 births
Living people
People from Bagnara Calabra
Italian women singers